Museum Huta Bolon Simanindo is a museum on in the village of Simanindo on Samosir Island in Sumatra, Indonesia. The museum is housed in the former home of Rajah Simalungun, a Batak king who had 14 wives. The roof was decorated with 10 buffalo horns representing the 10 generations of the dynasty. The museum's collection includes brass cooking utensils, weapons, crockery from the Dutch and Chinese, sculptures, and Batak carvings. Dance performances are given daily and audience participation encouraged.

See also
List of museums in Indonesia

References

Museums in Indonesia
Buildings and structures in North Sumatra
Tourist attractions in North Sumatra